Wamba Territory is a part of the Haut-Uele province of the Democratic Republic of the Congo.  The administrative center is the town of Wamba.

Mining
As of 2011, Kilo Goldmines was active in a joint venture with Somituri sprl, a local company, in exploiting properties in the territories of Mambasa and Wamba near the village of Nia Nia. Colonial mines produced gold in this area from the 1920s until 1958.

Divisions
The territory is divided into chiefdoms:
Mabudu-Malika-Baberu Chiefdom
Bafwakoy Chiefdom
Balika-Toriko Chiefdom
Malika Chiefdom
Bafwagada Chiefdom
Wadimbisa-Mabudu Chiefdom
Timoniko Chiefdom
Makoda Chiefdom
Mangbele Chiefdom
Malamba Chiefdom
Maha Chiefdom

References

Territories of Haut-Uélé Province